James H. Donnewald (January 29, 1925 – September 18, 2009) was an American politician from the state of Illinois. He was a Democrat who served as state Treasurer from 1983 until 1987.

Donnewald was born in 1925 in Carlyle, Illinois. A lawyer by profession, he graduated from the Lincoln College of Law, Springfield, Illinois in 1949 and was admitted to the bar in 1951.

In 1948, Donnewald was elected as a Democratic precinct committeeman. He was elected as a Carlyle Township Supervisor in 1949 where he would serve until 1951.

He was elected to the Illinois House of Representatives in 1960 and re-elected in 1962. He was subsequently elected to the state Senate in 1964. During his tenure, he would serve as the assistant Senate majority leader.

In 1982, he was elected as the state Treasurer. Despite the support for his reelection in 1986 by the Illinois Democratic Central Committee, including U.S. Senator Alan Dixon, Thom Serafin, and William Griffin, he was defeated by Jerome Cosentino, who was also his predecessor. He left office in 1987 and retired from elective politics.

Donnewald died on September 18, 2009 at Barnes-Jewish Hospital in St. Louis, Missouri. He was 84.

Notes

|-

|-

|-

|-

1925 births
2009 deaths
People from Carlyle, Illinois
State treasurers of Illinois
Democratic Party Illinois state senators
Democratic Party members of the Illinois House of Representatives
20th-century American politicians
Lincoln College of Law alumni
Illinois lawyers
20th-century American lawyers